Myanmar participated in the 2018 Asian Para Games in Jakarta, Indonesia, from 6 to 13 October 2018. Athletes from Myanmar competed in Athletics, Chess, Sitting Volleyball and Swimming. Myanmar won 4 silver medals, 2 bronze medals and finished 27th in the medal table.

Medal summary

Medalists

References 

Nations at the 2018 Asian Para Games
2018 in Burmese sport
2018